Heart of Scotland may refer to:
Heart of Scotland services
Centre of Scotland